The Ten Pound Island Light is a historic lighthouse in Gloucester Harbor in Gloucester, Massachusetts. It is located on Ten Pound Island, near the eastern end of the harbor. The main body is painted white, and the top is painted black.

The tower is the only surviving part of a more extensive light station, which included a keeper's house and an oil house.  The island additionally hosted a federal fish hatchery and a Coast Guard air (seaplane) station; only ruins survive.

The lighthouse was listed on the National Register of Historic Places in 1988. Both Winslow Homer and Fitz Henry Lane painted the first tower.

See also
Annisquam Harbor Light
National Register of Historic Places listings in Gloucester, Massachusetts
National Register of Historic Places listings in Essex County, Massachusetts

References

Lighthouses completed in 1881
Lighthouses on the National Register of Historic Places in Massachusetts
Buildings and structures in Gloucester, Massachusetts
Lighthouses in Essex County, Massachusetts
National Register of Historic Places in Essex County, Massachusetts
1821 establishments in Massachusetts